Tuja may refer to:

Tuja (river), a river in Poland
Tuja, Nowy Dwór Gdański County, a village in Poland
KTRI Tuja, a Polish military vehicle

See also
Tuja-Stadion, a stadium in Germany
Thuja, a genus of trees